Campylomormyrus is a genus of elephantfish in the family Mormyridae.

Species

There are currently 15 recognized species in this genus:.

 Campylomormyrus alces (Boulenger 1920) (Stanley Falls elephantfish)
 Campylomormyrus bredoi (Poll 1945) (Mweru elephantfish)
 Campylomormyrus cassaicus (Poll 1967) (donkey-faced elephant nose)
 Campylomormyrus christyi (Boulenger 1920) (Christy's elephantfish)
 Campylomormyrus compressirostris (Pellegrin 1924)
 Campylomormyrus curvirostris (Boulenger 1898) (Matadi elephantfish)
 Campylomormyrus elephas (Boulenger 1898) (elephant-trunk mormyrid)
 Campylomormyrus luapulaensis (L. R. David & Poll 1937) (Kabunda elephantfish)
 Campylomormyrus mirus (Boulenger 1898) (Upoto elephantfish)
 Campylomormyrus numenius (Boulenger 1898) (Upoto elephantfish)
 Campylomormyrus orycteropus Poll, J. P. Gosse & Orts 1982 (Pweto elephantfish)
 Campylomormyrus phantasticus (Pellegrin 1927) (fantastic elephantfish)
 Campylomormyrus rhynchophorus (Boulenger 1898) (double-trunk elephant nose)
 Campylomormyrus tamandua (Günther 1864) (Worm-jawed elephantfish)
 Campylomormyrus tshokwe (Poll 1967) (Dundo elephantfish)

References

Weakly electric fish
Ray-finned fish genera
Mormyridae